Isonicotinic acid or pyridine-4-carboxylic acid is an organic compound with the formula C5H4N(CO2H). It is a derivative of pyridine with a carboxylic acid substituent at the 4-position. It is an isomer of picolinic acid and nicotinic acid, which have the carboxyl group at the 2- and 3-position respectively compared to the 4-position for isonicotinic acid.

Derivatives
Isonicotinic acids is a term loosely used for derivatives of isonicotinic acid. Hydrazide derivatives include isoniazid, iproniazid, and nialamide. Amide and ester derivatives include ethionamide and dexamethasone isonicotinate.

See also
 Pyridinecarboxylic acids

References

External links
 

Aromatic acids
4-Pyridyl compounds